Saint Joseph's Arts Society, run by the Saint Joseph's Arts Foundation, is an arts nonprofit 501(c)(3) organization and arts community located at 1401 Howard Street in the South of Market neighborhood of San Francisco, California.

History 
The Saint Joseph's Arts Society is largely subscription-based and was founded in 2018 by interior designer Ken Fulk. The organization is located in the restored, historic St. Joseph's Church, which is Romanesque in style and 22,000-square-feet. The building had seismic damaged after the 1989 San Francisco earthquake, and Fulk renovated the building. 

The Saint Joseph's Arts Society works in collaboration with other arts nonprofits, and serves in many capacities including as a gallery, museum, event space, and an artist-in-residence space. It houses a branch of Carpenters Workshop Gallery. In 2021, Saint Joseph's Arts Society hosted Litquake, San Francisco's annual literary festival.

References

External links 
 Official website

Art museums and galleries in San Francisco
Art galleries established in 2018
Contemporary art galleries in the United States
Arts organizations based in the San Francisco Bay Area
Culture of San Francisco
Art in the San Francisco Bay Area
South of Market, San Francisco
501(c)(3) organizations